Cedar Ridge, California may refer to:
 Cedar Ridge, Coconino County, Arizona
 Cedar Ridge, Nevada County, California
 Cedar Ridge, Tuolumne County, California